Cha Vang was a 30-year-old Hmong man from Green Bay, who was murdered by James Nichols in 2007. Cha Vang was found shot and stabbed, his corpse hidden, in the woods near Peshtigo, Wisconsin.  Nichols admitted to killing Vang, insisting the killing was self-defense. On March 19, 2007, Nichols pleaded not guilty to the charges of first degree intentional homicide, felony possession of a weapon, and hiding a corpse.

On October 6, 2007, a jury found Nichols guilty of a lesser charge of second degree intentional homicide and sentenced him to 60 years in prison. "The message sent to the Hmong community is that someone can shoot a Hmong hunter and not get the maximum sentence," said Tou Ger Xiong, spokesman for the Coalition for Community Relations in St. Paul, Minnesota.

Evidence and motivation 
Mark Witeck, who performed the autopsy on Cha Vang, testified that Vang was shot from about 50 feet away by a shotgun, and stabbed six times in his face and neck.

Attention to possible racial motives has been brought due to some of Nichols' own statements. Nichols has been quoted on record saying Hmong people are bad, mean and "kill everything and that they go for anything that moves." Nichols' employer has testified that two months before the killing, Nichols mentioned that he would have killed a Hmong hunter that he had seen in the woods if he had been carrying a shotgun rather than an air-rifle.

Effects of the killing 
Reports of racial tension in the forests of Wisconsin during hunting seasons had been reported since Chai Soua Vang (no relation), a Hmong hunter, was convicted of killing six Caucasian hunters two years before Cha Vang's murder.  Besides the immediate effects felt by family and friends at the death of Cha Vang, the killing stressed the already-tense relations between the Hmong community and predominantly Caucasian hunters in northern Wisconsin.

References 

1978 births
2007 murders in the United States
Living people
People from Green Bay, Wisconsin
American people convicted of murder
People convicted of murder by Wisconsin
Racially motivated violence against Asian-Americans
Asian-American-related controversies